Mahadev Bajgai is a Nepalese politician and Former Mayor of Lamki Chuha Municipality of  Kailali District. He is secretariat Member of CPN UML Sudurpaschim Province Committee. He has been in the limelight time and again for his pro-citizen decisions and activities. He has diverted funds earmarked for the purchase of vehicles into the construction of a hospital instead. A budget of Rs 7.5 million was allocated to vehicle purchases for municipality officials. But by the third municipal council meeting, Bajgain decideded to divert the vehicle purchase funds to the construction of a hospital in Ward No 10. He is chairman of Thakur Baba Business Group, growing industry in Kailali District and Growing Poultry industry in western Nepal.In the 10th general convention of Communist Party of Nepal (Unified Marxist–Leninist), Bajgain was proposal of Bhim Bahadur Rawal to his Candidacy for the post of Party Chairman.

Personal life 
Mahadev Bajgain  was born on 23 February 1978 in a Brahmin family . He is the second son of Maniram Bajgain and Durpata devi Bajgain. He started His Political life in Kailali District.

Electoral history 
He was elected to the Mayor of Lamki Chuha Municipality in Nepalese local elections, 2017. He lost the 2022 Nepalese local elections for the post of Mayor of Lamki Chuha Municipality.

Nepalese local elections, 2017
He has been elected to the Mayor of Lamkichuha Municipality in Nepalese local elections, 2017 defeating Bhakta Bahadur Thapa, Nepali Congress candidate by the margin of 667 votes.

2022 Nepalese local elections
In 2022 Nepalese local elections, Mahadev Bajgain lost the election with Sushila Shahi. Susila Shahi was a mayor candidate from the Alliance of 5 Political Parties that are Nepali Congress, CPN (Maoist Centre), CPN (Unified Socialist),People's Socialist Party, Nepal and Rastriya Janamorcha. Mahadev Bajgain was believed to be a strongest Candidate but he became the Victim of Alliance of 5 Political Party. CPN-UML Kailali District Committee Chairman Ratan Bahadur Thapa was removed from the post of Party District Chairman for playing a role in defeating the party’s official candidate Bajgain in the local elections.

See also
Lamkichuha Municipality
Communist Party of Nepal (Unified Marxist–Leninist)

References

Communist Party of Nepal (Unified Marxist–Leninist) politicians
People from Kailali District
Mayors of places in Nepal
Living people
People from Achham District
Nepal Communist Party (NCP) politicians
1978 births